Villalta is a surname of Spanish origin. Notable people with the surname include:

Alberto Villalta (born 1947), Salvadoran footballer
José María Villalta Florez-Estrada (born 1977) Costa Rican politician
Luis Villalta (1969–2004), Peruvian boxer
Miguel Villalta (born 1981), Peruvian footballer
Renato Villalta (born 1955), Italian basketball player